DND or Dnd can refer to:

Government 
 Department of National Defence (Canada)
 Department of National Defense (Philippines)
 United States District Court for the District of North Dakota

Commerce 
 Da Niang Dumpling, a Chinese fast food restaurant chain
 Dunkin' Donuts

Entertainment 
 DnD (an alternate spelling of D&D), an acronym for Dungeons & Dragons, a roleplaying game.
 dnd (video game), a role-playing video game from 1975
 DND (video game), a role-playing video game from 1977 and another author
 DND (song), a 2020 song by Polo G

Science and technology 
 Detonation nanodiamond
 Drag and drop, in computer interfaces, an action of clicking on an object and dragging it to a different location
 Do not disturb, a status often used in messaging apps such as Discord and Skype
 Do not distribute, used in private file sharing, especially for warez not meant to be released to the public
 Dnd, the symmetry group of antiprism related to n-sided polygons

Other 
 Dobrovol'naya Narodnaya Druzhina, literally Voluntary People's Squad, voluntary detachment for maintaining public order in Soviet Union and Russia
 DND Flyway, an expressway in India that connects Delhi to Noida
 Do not disturb (disambiguation)
 Do Not Disturb (DND) registry
 Drunk and disorderly; see Public intoxication
 Dundee Airport's IATA airport code
 DND (Dispatch News Desk) A Pakistan-based news agency.

See also
D&D (disambiguation)